The Trinity of Carnatic music, also known as The Three Jewels of Carnatic music, refer to the outstanding trio of composer-musicians of Carnatic music in the 18th century, being Tyagaraja, Muthuswami Dikshitar and Syama Sastri. Prolific in composition, the Trinity of Carnatic music are known for creating a new era in the history of Carnatic music by bringing about a noticeable change in what was the existing Carnatic music tradition. Compositions of the Trinity of Carnatic music are recognized as being distinct in style, and original in handling ragas. All three composers were born in Thiruvarur, formerly part of Thanjavur District in Tamilnadu. M. S. Subbalakshmi, D. K. Pattammal, and M. L. Vasanthakumari, who are Carnatic musicians of the 20th century, are popularly referred to as the female Trinity of Carnatic music.

Compositions
Muthuswami Dikshitar mainly composed in Sanskrit and Manipravalam (Tamil and Sanskrit), while Tyagaraja and Syama Sastri mainly composed in Telugu.

Ragas and talas
The Trinity of Carnatic music composed new ragas and talas, and had a remarkable ability to introduce innovations within the same raga.

Compositions of Syama Sastri in 'apoorva' ragas like Chinthamani, and Kalagada evidence his originality and genius in discovering new forms in Carnatic music. The creative ability of Syama Sastri is possibly best exampled in his concert-contest against Kesavvaya, a great Carnatic musician from Bobbili. During this contest which took place at the court of the king of Thanjavur, although Kesavayya sang a rare raga followed by a tana in different jathis and gathis, Syama Sastri reproduced similar tana varieties, and to the delight of the audience, went further to introduce other varieties which were not known to Kesavvaya.

See also

	
 List of Carnatic composers
 List of composers who created ragas
 List of Carnatic instrumentalists
 The Tamil Trinity

Notes

References 
 

Carnatic music